George Bissell is the name of:
 George Bissell (industrialist) (1821–1884), American oil businessman
 George Edwin Bissell (1839–1920), American sculptor